Forward Operating Base Arian is a former forward operating base operated by the International Security Assistance Force (ISAF). It was originally Combat Post Arian, but in 2011 rapidly expanded to forward operating base size. It was in Ghazni Province, Afghanistan.

Deployed units

 2nd Battalion, 504th Parachute Infantry Regiment, 1st Brigade Combat Team, 82nd Airborne Division (2012-)
 307th Brigade Support Battalion, 82nd Airborne Division (2012-)
 Bravo Battery, 3rd Battalion 319 Airborne Field Artillery Regiment, 82 Airborne Division (2012-)
 6th Kandak, 3rd Brigade, 203rd Corps (2012)
 Alpha Battery, 3rd Battalion, 6th Field Artillery Regiment (2013)

See also 

 List of NATO installations in Afghanistan
 List of Afghan Armed Forces installations

References 

Military installations of the United States in Afghanistan
Military bases of Poland in Afghanistan
Ghazni Province